Dinar Gilmutdinov  (born 10 August 1969, Chebykovo, Mishkinsky District, Republic of Bashkortostan) is a Russian political figure and a deputy of the 8th State Duma. 

In 1991, he started working as an inspector of the road patrol service. In 1996, he was appointed as a deputy head of the Main Directorate for Traffic Safety in Ufa. From 2005 to 2021, he was the chief of the UGIBDD of the Ministry of Internal Affairs of Bashkortostan. He left the post in 2021 to become a deputy for the 8th State Duma from the Bashkortostan constituency.

References

1969 births
Living people
United Russia politicians
21st-century Russian politicians
Eighth convocation members of the State Duma (Russian Federation)